Chubrika is a village in Ardino Municipality, Kardzhali Province, southern-central Bulgaria. To the north is Yabalkovets and to the northeast is Kobilyane, along the 865 road. It was formerly called Fakrŭ Bunar.

References

Villages in Kardzhali Province